Cerbère station (French: Gare de Cerbère) is the railway station serving the border town Cerbère, Pyrénées-Orientales department, southern France.

It is connected to the Portbou railway station in Spain by the Balitres tunnel, which uses standard gauge track for trains continuing in France and Iberian gauge track for trains continuing in Spain; both stations provide an opportunity to change between French and Spanish services. The tunnel provided a walking escape route for defeated Spanish republicans in 1939 at the end of the Spanish Civil War.

The following services currently call at Cerbère:
night services (Intercités de nuit) Paris–Carcassonne–Narbonne–Cerbère
local service (TER Occitanie) Portbou–Cerbère–Narbonne–Montpellier–Avignon
local service (TER Occitanie) Portbou–Cerbère–Perpignan–Narbonne–Toulouse
local service (Rodalies de Catalunya) Barcelona–Portbou–Cerbère (Outbound service only from Barcelona)

Historically, the station was also served by the Catalan Talgo service from Montpellier to Barcelona and the Talgo from Montpellier to Murcia, which changed gauge at Portbou, and the Estrella Costa Brava sleeper train from Madrid (on the Iberian gauge track).

References

Railway stations in Pyrénées-Orientales
Railway stations in France opened in 1878
Cerbère